The 1986 Hammersmith and Fulham Council election took place on 8 May 1986 to elect members of Hammersmith and Fulham London Borough Council in London, England. The whole council was up for election and the Labour party gained overall control of the council.

Background

Labour, the Conservatives and the SDP Liberal Alliance all fielded a full slate of 50 candidates.  On the ballot paper the third-party candidates were listed alternatively as 'SDP-Liberal Alliance' and 'Liberal Alliance-SDP'.

The Humanist Party ran seven candidates - two each in Gibbs Green, Normand and Avonmore wards and a further one in Margravine.  Across London the party ran a further 11 candidates at this election - averaging 43 votes per candidate.

The Green Party ran a single candidate in six wards - Colehill, Crabtree, Palace, Sherbrooke, Town, White City & Shepherds Bush.  At the previous election the Ecology Party had fielded four candidates in different wards.  Across London at this election the Green Party ran a further 161 candidates.

Four candidates listed themselves under the 'Village Independent' banner - two each in Addison and Brook Green wards.

The Revolutionary Communist Party ran a single candidate - in White City & Shepherds Bush ward.  Across London they ran a further 10 candidates - averaging 68 votes per person.

No candidates listed themselves as representing the Residents Association - down from seven at the previous election.

The Workers Revolutionary Party didn't field any candidates - down from two at the previous election.

The National Front didn't field any candidates - down from two at the previous election.

A total of 168 candidates put themselves forward for the 50 available seats - a decrease from the 175 candidates who contested the previous election.

Election result
The Labour Party won 40 seats - a gain of 15 seats from the 1982 result, and took control of the council.
The Conservative Party won 9 seats - a loss of 14 seats from their 1982 result.

The SDP Liberal Alliance retained 1 seat and lost 1 seat.  This was the seventh and final election for the Liberal candidate Simon Knott - and his fourth victory.  He also stood as a candidate for the House of Commons four times for the Barons Court constituency, three times for the Hammersmith North constituency and twice for the Hammersmith constituency, without success.

Ward results

Addison

Avonmore

Broadway

Brook Green

Colehill

College Park & Old Oak

Coningham

Crabtree

Eel Brook

Gibbs Green

Grove

Margravine

Normand

Palace

Ravenscourt

Sands End

Sherbrooke

Starch Green

Sulivan

Town

Walham

White City & Shepherds Bush

Wormholt

References

1986
1986 London Borough council elections
20th century in the London Borough of Hammersmith and Fulham